Alanson Bigelow Houghton  (October 10, 1863 – September 15, 1941) was an American businessman, politician, and diplomat who served as a Congressman and Ambassador.  He was a member of the Republican Party.

Early life and business career

Alanson B. Houghton was born on October 10, 1863, in Cambridge, Middlesex County, Massachusetts. He was the son of Ellen Ann (Bigelow) and Amory Houghton, Jr. (1837–1909), who would later be President of the Corning Glass Works, the company founded by Alanson's grandfather Amory Houghton, Sr. in 1851.

In 1868, his family moved to Corning, New York.  He attended the Corning Free Academy in Corning and St. Paul's School in Concord, New Hampshire.  Houghton graduated from Harvard University in 1886 and then pursued postgraduate courses in Europe.  He attended graduate school in Göttingen, Berlin, and Paris until 1889.

Upon his return to Corning in 1889, Houghton began work for his family's business, Corning Glass Works.  He served as vice president of the company from 1902 to 1910, and as the company's president from 1910 to 1918.  Under Houghton's leadership, the company tripled in size to become one of the largest producers of glass products in the United States.  The company manufactured 40% of incandescent light bulbs and 75% of the railway signal glass used in the U.S.

Houghton's interest in and promotion of education, particularly in western New York state, led to his being appointed a trustee of Hobart College in 1917.

He was a member of the Jekyll Island Club (aka The Millionaires Club) on Jekyll Island, Georgia, along with J.P. Morgan and William Rockefeller among others.

Politics
Houghton was a presidential elector in the 1904 presidential election. He was also a presidential elector in 1916, voting for the Republican candidates Charles Evans Hughes and Charles W. Fairbanks.

In 1918, Alanson B. Houghton defeated incumbent Congressman Harry H. Pratt in the Republican primary.  He went on to win the general election and joined the Sixty-sixth Congress, representing New York's 37th Congressional District.  In 1920, Houghton garnered 68% of the vote to win reelection over Democrat Charles R. Durham and Socialist Francis Toomey.  Houghton took office on March 4, 1919.  During his two terms in the House, Houghton served on the Foreign Affairs and Ways and Means committees.

Diplomacy
Houghton, having studied in prewar Germany, admired German culture and understood German politics.  His appointment was approved by the U.S. Senate and well received by the Weimar Republic. On February 28, 1922, Houghton resigned his House seat to accept appointment from President Warren G. Harding as the U.S. Ambassador to Germany.   Houghton believed that world peace, European stability, and American prosperity depended upon a reconstruction of Europe's economy and political system. He saw his role as promoting American political engagement with Europe.  He overcame domestic opposition, and disinterest in Washington. He quickly realized that the central issues of the day were all entangled in economics, especially war debts owed by the Allies to the United States, reparations owed by Germany to the Allies, worldwide inflation, and international trade and investment. Solutions, he believed, required new policies by Washington and close cooperation with Britain and Germany.  He was a leading promoter of the Dawes Plan.

On February 24, 1925, President Calvin Coolidge appointed Houghton as the U.S. Ambassador to Great Britain.  Houghton assumed the post on April 6, 1925, and served until April 27, 1929.  Houghton's service in both Germany and England gave him a unique ability to address the issue of the war reparations Germany owed to its World War I opponents, England being one of them.  Houghton laid some of the groundwork for the Dawes Plan, named after then U.S. Vice President Charles G. Dawes, who would be Houghton's successor as Ambassador to Great Britain.

In 1928, Houghton ran for the U.S. Senate from New York against first-term incumbent Royal S. Copeland, a Democrat.  Houghton lost by just over one percentage point.

Death and legacy
After his loss in the 1928 Senate race, Houghton returned to managing the Corning Glass Works. He was a founding member of the Board of Trustees of the Institute for Advanced Study, in Princeton, New Jersey, serving as Chairman until his death in 1941. He also was an original standing committee member of the Foundation for the Study of Cycles and served as vice president of the American Peace Society, which publishes World Affairs, the oldest U.S. journal on international relations.

Houghton died at his summer home in South Dartmouth, Massachusetts, on September 15, 1941. He was interred at Hope Cemetery Annex in Corning, New York.

During World War II the Liberty ship  was built in Panama City, Florida, and named in his honor.

Houghton's son, Amory Houghton (1899–1981), served as the United States Ambassador to France (1957–1961) under President Dwight D. Eisenhower. His grandson, Amo Houghton, was a U.S. Congressman from New York from 1987 until 2005.

See also
 List of covers of Time magazine (1920s) – April 5, 1926
 The Harvard Monthly

References

Further reading
 Jones, Kenneth Paul, ed. U.S. Diplomats in Europe, 1919–41 (ABC-CLIO. 1981) online on Houghton's role in Europe, pp 25–42..
 Matthews, Jeffrey J. Alanson B. Houghton: Ambassador in the New Era. Wilmington, Del.: Scholarly Resources Inc., 2004.
 Retrieved on 2008-02-15
Kestenbaum, Lawrence.  The Political Graveyard.
Harvard Business School.  Leadership database.

External links
 

American business executives
Corning Inc.
1863 births
1941 deaths
Businesspeople from Cambridge, Massachusetts
Ambassadors of the United States to the United Kingdom
Ambassadors of the United States to Germany
Politicians from Cambridge, Massachusetts
Republican Party members of the United States House of Representatives from New York (state)
Harvard University alumni
Politicians from Corning, New York
1904 United States presidential electors
1916 United States presidential electors
People from Dartmouth, Massachusetts
20th-century American diplomats